Irving Cummings Jr. (January 27, 1918 – March 26, 1996) was an American producer and writer, known for the NBC television series Fury.

Biography
Cummings was the son of actor and director Irving Cummings. They worked together several times: in 1948 they produced The Sign of the Ram together, and in 1951 he produced the film Double Dynamite, which his father directed.

He died of cancer in Van Nuys, California.

Filmography

References

1918 births
1996 deaths
American film producers